Mujhse Kuchh Kehti...Yeh Khamoshiyaan is an Indian television series on Star Plus.

Plot 
The story follows the journey of Gauri an NRI who is brought up at Southampton in London. She is set to marry her childhood friend Siddharth and is eagerly expecting for her grandfather and her extended family to attend her wedding, whom she has never seen, living at Kolhapur in India. With them not showing up, she decides to travel to India secretly and find them. Soon before her marriage she leaves to India where she meets Garv meanwhile dark secrets of her family starts revealing. After a series of turns and events, soon after Siddharth calls off his marriage with Gauri just a day before, she marries Garv and the series ends.

Cast

Main
 Mrunal Thakur as Gauri Bhonsle
 Mohit Sehgal as Siddharth Kapoor
 Manit Joura as Garv Shinde

Recurring
 Shruti Ulfat as Ashwin Bhosale
 Mrinal Kulkarni as Pratiksha Bhosale: Gauri's mother
 Ravindra Mankani as Jaywantrao Bhonsle "Appa Saheb"
 Resham Tipnis as Asawari Bhosle
 Utkarsha Naik as Rajlaxmi
 Tushar Dalvi as Asawari's husband, the eldest son of Jaywantrao.
 Shilpa Tulaskar
 Rushali Arora

Production

Development
The series was supposed to premiere in August 2012 in an evening slot but was postpone due to unavailability of prime time slot as expected by production house. The series marked the debut of actors Shakti Anand and his wife Sai Deodhar as producers.

As a part of promotion before its premiere, the  missing posters, advertisements and newspaper reports across cities stating "looking for Missing NRI girl Gauri Bhonsle" were circulated without revealing it being a series promotion then. Days after, it was revealed as a promotion for the series.

The series was filmed at Kolhapur in Maharashtra, India and London.

In January 2013, lead Mohit Segal quit the series.

Cancellation
Since its inception, the series failed to garner good ratings despite few changes in its plot and was off aired within three months on 23 February 2013.

Reception
The series debuted with a good viewership ratings of 4.2 TVR however soon dropped down to 1.9 TVR as in second week of December 2012 and dropped further the following weeks.

References 

StarPlus original programming
2010s Indian television series debuts
2012 Indian television series debuts
2013 Indian television series endings
Indian drama television series
Indian television soap operas